KRVM-FM (91.9 MHz) is a community radio station in Eugene, Oregon, United States. KRVM's primary programming is available via online streaming, with listener-supporters located around the world. The station license and studio facility are owned by Eugene School District 4J, but the school district provides no direct funding to the station; all funding comes from listener supporters, business underwriters, and the Corporation For Public Broadcasting. The main studio is located at Sheldon High School, with a satellite studio at Spencer Butte Middle School.

Two additional stations, KSYD (92.1 FM) in Reedsport (serving Coos Bay) and KAVE (88.5 FM) in Oakridge, rebroadcast KRVM, as does a translator, K211BP (90.1 FM) in Florence, Oregon. KRVM-FM broadcasts in HD Radio.

History
KRVM-FM is the oldest public radio station in the state of Oregon.  The first words ever spoken on FM radio in the Pacific Northwest were broadcast on KRVM on December 6, 1947, and the station formally opened in early 1948. It was the only educational FM station west of Minneapolis and north of San Francisco and just the twelfth in the United States. The call letters were almost WDWD until Roger Houslam, the founder of the station, advised the Federal Communications Commission of its mistake in assigning a call sign starting with W to a station west of the Mississippi River. Originally on 90.1 MHz, the station moved to 91.9 MHz in 1954 because it generated interference to television sets attempting to tune in KOIN-TV on channel 6 (82–88 MHz) in Portland.

During the day on weekdays, KRVM features a progressive adult album alternative music format with students handling much of the hosting and voice tracking. Other hours feature specialty programming encompassing many genres of music, including "Breakfast With The Blues" every morning.  Specialty shows are hosted by volunteer DJs who select their own music.

See also
List of community radio stations in the United States

References

External links
Official Website

RVM-FM
RVM-FM
Radio stations established in 1947
1960 establishments in Oregon
Community radio stations in the United States